Ball of Wax may refer to:
Ball of wax
Ball of wax example, a thought experiment of René Descartes
Ball of Wax, a song in early productions of Ghost the Musical

Ball of Wax, a 2008 episode of Tak and the Power of Juju (TV series)

See also
The whole ball of wax